Between Shades of Gray, a New York Times Best Seller, is the debut novel of Lithuanian-American novelist Ruta Sepetys. It follows the  Stalinist repressions of the mid-20th century and follows the life of a teenage girl Lina as she is deported from her native Lithuania with her mother and younger brother, and the journey they take to a Gulag labor camp in Siberia. It was nominated for the 2012 CILIP Carnegie Medal and has been translated into more than 27 languages.

Between Shades of Gray was originally intended as a young adult novel, but there have been several adult publications. In an interview with ThirstforFiction, Ruta Sepetys said that the reason she intended Between Shades of Gray to be a young adult novel was because she met many survivors in Lithuania who were themselves, teenagers, during the deportations and had a greater will to live than many of their adult counterparts at the time.

Inspiration and basis
Between Shades of Gray is partly based upon the stories Sepetys heard from survivors of Soviet repressions in the Baltic states during a visit to her relatives in Lithuania. Sepetys decided she needed to write a fiction novel rather than a non-fiction volume as a way of making it easier for survivors to talk to her. She interviewed dozens of people during her stay.

Synopsis
Lina Vilkas is introduced as a young artist living comfortably in her home in Kaunas, Lithuania, with her loving family. But, on June 14, 1941, Soviet officers (the NKVD) barge into her home, tearing her family from the comfortable life they've known. Separated from her father and forced onto a crowded and dirty train car, Lina, along with her mother and her younger brother Jonas, slowly makes her way north to a work camp in the coldest reaches of Siberia. Here they are forced, under Stalin's orders, to dig for beets and fight for their lives under the cruelest of conditions. Lina befriends many people and works hard alongside her mother and brother for food and survival.

Upon arriving at the camp, Lina and her family are forced to live with Ulyushka, a cruel, seemingly heartless woman who initially dislikes the Vilkas family and constantly takes their food and other goods from them as a form of rent. Elena Vilkas, Lina's mother, is kind and generous to Ulyushka, though Lina and her brother Jonas cannot understand why.

The family befriends fellow Lithuanian deportees including Andrius Arvydas (who later becomes Lina's love interest), Mr. Stalas (referred to as the Bald Man, who is secretly Jewish and adds a touch of humour because of his terrible advice and short temper), Mrs. Grybienė, Mrs. Rimas, and Aleksandras Lukas (a gray-haired man who was once a lawyer, often seen winding his watch, who is the voice and soul of reason).

One NKVD member, in particular, sticks out to Lina: Nikolai Kretzsky. Although he doesn't at first come off as necessarily kind or helpful, Kretzsky more or less befriends Lina and her mother. He can be seen as only being downright cruel to Lina when around other NKVD members. He doesn't seem to want to hurt Lina unless he absolutely has to. He is described as young, blonde-haired, and blue-eyed, and can be assumed to be quite handsome. Their relationship grows and remains important throughout the book.

Andrius Arvydas is handsome, golden-brown haired, and a source of comfort for Lina. At first, she dislikes him, dismissing him as an "idiot" because he smoked her book, which was a present from her dead grandmother. Their friendship blossoms but becomes troubled when Lina accuses Andrius and his mother of working for the NKVD. It turns out his mother was being unwillingly used as a prostitute because of her beauty, but only to protect her son. Andrius becomes Lina's more-or-less boyfriend and gives Lina a new book. Lina and her family are then separated from Andrius when they are transported to a different camp across the Arctic Circle. There, they are forced to build their own shelter to survive.

But then Lina's mother dies. Just when Lina doubts she will survive, a man who is a doctor, as well as an inspector of the work camps, shows up and gives everyone blankets and food. The doctor takes them home. After another long trip, Lina finds Andrius, and they get married.

Characters 
Lina Vilkas:  the story's 15-year-old protaGonst, taken in the beGinning with her mother And brother to a labour camp. She's a brave and determined girl, described as very similar to her mother.
Jonas Vilkas: Lina's 10-year-old brother. He is a major character, beloved by all, including the sour Mr. Stalas. His sweet and innocent personality is evident throughout the book, although Lina is frightened by the emotional changes he experiences over the course of their ordeal.
Elena Vilkas: Lina and Jonas' mother. A loving woman, kind and generous with her gestures and food, who perishes from grief and her attempts to save her children by giving them her rations. She also teaches her children that it is important to do what is right, not what is easy. When she was alive she was described as a beautiful woman, with blond hair and blue eyes.
Kostas Vilkas: Lina and Jonas' father, who is separated from his family and shipped to a prison called Krasnoyarsk. Nikolai Kretzsky and Ivanov claimed Kostas was dead, but whether or not they are telling the truth is unknown. Much of the book revolves around Lina's desperate attempts to locate and contact her father. In Salt to the Sea , it is revealed that he was tortured and killed in a Soviet gulag.
Andrius Arvydas: A handsome 17-year-old boy, whom Lina and her family meet on the train to the labour camps. He falls in love with Lina in exile, often sneaks food and supplies to the Vilkas family, and saves them a number of times with his knowledge of the happenings of the NKVD. He and Lina are said to be married in the epilogue.
Mrs. Arvydas: Andrius' beautiful and dainty mother. She becomes a prostitute for the NKVD after they threaten to kill her son if she did not do so. 
Nikolai Kretzsky: A young NKVD officer who helps Lina and her mother. While Lina finds him cruel and ruthless throughout much of the novel, he actually struggles with his work due to its immorality. While he is described to hit and shove the prisoners, he is also the only member of the NKVD who turns as the women undress for their bath, saves Elena from his fellow officers when they assault her, and sends for a doctor to save the prisoners dying in the second camp.   
Mr. Stalas:  A salty elderly man, distraught with guilt. He often complains and advises everyone to kill themselves before the NKVD does. It is later discovered that he had revealed the prisoners' identities and workplaces, resulting in their imprisonment. He is known to have a soft spot for the Vilkas family, despite his rudeness towards them, and he later helps in saving the sick prisoners.
  Janina: A young girl partial to Lina, whose doll she lost when an officer shot its head off.
 Joana:  Lina's beloved cousin and best friend, who flees to Germany with her family before Stalin begins the deportation. Their escape is the reason for the Vilkas family's imprisonment. Joana is consistently mentioned but only appears in flashbacks. She is one of the main characters in Sepetys' third novel, Salt to the Sea (2016).
Ivanov: An NKVD officer, perhaps the most despicable, who allows many prisoners to die, and finds great humour in the pain.
Ona: A young woman, not believed to be 20, who is forced on the train immediately after giving birth to her baby. Neither her nor her baby is given any medical attention. After losing her baby, Ona goes insane and is fatally shot by the NKVD.
Aleksandras Lukas: A gray-haired man who is obsessed with winding his watch. He is an attorney from Kaunas. He shows intelligence and dignity throughout the novel, especially when the deportees were asked to sign papers condemning them to imprisonment.

Reception
Between Shades of Gray received intensely positive reviews. Linda Sue Park of The New York Times described it as a "superlative first novel" whilst Susan Carpenter of the LA Times called it a "story of hardship as well as human triumph". Publishers Weekly praised Between Shades of Gray, calling it a "harrowing page-turner, made all the more so for its basis in historical fact".

The book was a finalist for 2012 William C. Morris Award for a debut young adult novel and for the 2012 Amelia Elizabeth Walden Award. It was shortlisted for 2012 Carnegie Medal and won the 2012 Golden Kite Award.

Film adaptation

Recognition

National awards
A New York Times Bestseller
An International Bestseller
A Carnegie Medal Nominee
A William C. Morris Finalist
A New York Times Notable Book
A Wall Street Journal Best Children's Book
Winner of The Golden Kite Award for Fiction
An ALA Notable Book
A Publishers Weekly Best Children's Book of 2011
YALSA's Top 10 Best Fiction For Young Adults
A School Library Journal Best Book of 2011
A Booklist Best Book of 2011
A Kirkus Best Book of 2011
iTunes Best Teen Novel of 2011
A Junior Library Guild Selection
Notable Books For a Global Society Award
An Indies Choice Book Awards Finalist
IRA Children's and Young Adult's Book Award
Amazon Top Ten Teen Books of 2011
A CYBILS Finalist for 2011
National Blue Ribbon Selection by Book of the Month Club
A St. Louis Post Dispatch Best Book of 2011
A Columbus Dispatch Best Book of 2011
Winner of the SCBWI Work-in-Progress Grant
Georgia Peach Honor Book (GA)

International awards
Finalist for the Carnegie Medal in the UK
Shortlisted for the Lewisham Book Award in the UK
A Waterstones Children's Book Prize Nominee in the UK
Amazon UK Top Ten Books of 2011
Finalist for Le Prix des Incorruptibles in France
Winner of the Prix RTL Lire For Best Novel For Young People in France
Winner of the Prix Livrentête in France
Finalist for the Historia Prize in France
Winner of the Peter Pan Silver Star in Sweden
Winner of the Prix Farniente in Belgium
Winner of the Flanders Young Adult Literature Jury Prize in Belgium 
Winner of the KJV-Award in Belgium
Winner of the National Patriot Award in Lithuania
Winner of the Global Lithuanian Leader Award in Lithuania
A Golden List Nominee in the Netherlands
A Magazyn Literacki KSIĄŻKI! Best Book in Poland
Winner of the Prix des Libraries du Québec in Canada
'Der Leserpreis' Readers Choice Finalist in Germany
A 'Best Breakthrough Author' Nominee for the Penguin Teen Australia Awards
Finalist for the Sakura Medal in Japan

State awards
Texas Lonestar Reading List Master List (TX)
TAYSHAS Reading List Master List (TX)
Capitol Choices Noteworthy Books for Children and Teens Master List (D.C.)
Black-Eyed Susan Book Award Master List (MD)
Pennsylvania School Librarians Association Award Master List (PA)
The Flume: New Hampshire Readers' Choice Award Master List (NH)
Iowa Association of School Librarians Award Master List (IA)
Kentucky Bluegrass Award Master List (KY)
Nevada Young Readers Award Master List (NV)
Rhode Island Teen Book Award Master List (RI)
Maud Hart Lovelace Award (MN)
Missouri Association of School Librarians Gateway Award Master List (MO)
South Carolina Young Adult Book Award Master List (SC)
Virginia Readers' Choice Master List (VA)
Eliot Rosewater Rosie Award Master List (IN)
Nebraska Golden Sower Award (NE)
Volunteer State Book Award (TN)
Young Hoosier Book Award (IN)
Sequoyah Book Award (OK)

Translations
Czech:  "V šedých tónech," CooBoo, Albatros Media A.S.
Chinese: "Between Shades of Gray", ChinaCITIC Press, 
Complex Chinese: "Between Shades of Gray", 
Croatian: "Pomrčina srca", Znanje, 
Dutch: "Schaduwliefde," Moon, 2011 
English (Australian Edition): "Between Shades of Gray" Penguin, 
English (UK Young Adult Edition): "Between Shades of Gray" Puffin, 
English (UK Adult Edition): "Between Shades of Gray" Viking, 
Estonian: "Hallaaegade algus", Tammerraamat, 
Finnish: "Harmaata valoa", Wsoy, 
French: Ce qu'ils n'ont pas pu nous prendre, Gallimard Jeunesse, 
German: Und in mir der unbesiegbare Sommer, Carlsen Verlag, Hamburg,  
Greek: "Between Shades of Gray", Psichogios, 
Hebrew: "Between Shades of Gray", Miskal, 
Hungarian: "Arnyalatnyi remeny", Maxim Konyvkiado, 
Italian: Avevano spento anche la luna, Garzanti Libri, 
Japanese: "Between Shades of Gray", Iwanami Shoten, 
Latvian: "Starp pelēkiem toņiem", Zvaigzne ABC, 
Lithuanian: "Tarp pilkų debesų", Alma Littera, 
Macedonian "Крадци и проститутки,"  Sakam Knigi
Persian: "Between Shades of Gray", Morvarid
Polish: "szare sniegi syberii", Nasza Ksiegarnia, 
Portuguese (Brazil): "a vida em tons de cinza", Arqueiro, 
Portuguese (Portugal): "o longo inverno", Bertrand Editora/Contraponto, 
Romanian "Printre Tonuri Cenusii," Epica Publishing House
Serbian: "Putovanje pod zvezdama", Alnari, 
Slovakian: "Medzi odtieňmi sivej" Ikar, 
Spanish: Entre tonos de gris, Ediciones Maeva, 2011 
Swedish: "Strimmor av hopp", B/Wahlstroms, 
Turkish: "Gri Gölgeler Arasında" Delidolu, 
Ukrainian: "Поміж сірих сутінків" Klub simejnoho Dozvillia,

External links
Between Shades of Gray official website
Ruta Sepetys' official Website

Further reading

References

2011 American novels
Golden Kite Award-winning works
American young adult novels
Novels set in Lithuania
Novels set in Siberia
Novels set in the Stalin era
Novels set in the Gulag
2011 debut novels
Philomel Books books